Contro gli estimatori is the first studio album by the Italian rapper Bassi Maestro, released in 1996 under Mix Men Production, Bassi's label.

Track listing

Link 

1996 debut albums
Bassi Maestro albums